TilEm is an emulator that simulates certain Texas Instruments calculators on a generic computer. It is similar to TiEmu, uses GTK+, and works on many different operating systems like Linux/Unix, FreeBSD, 32-bit Microsoft Windows and so on. 

If you have a copy of the information in the ROM from one of the ZiLOG Z80 series Texas Instruments Graphing Calculators (TI-82, TI-83 series, TI-84 Plus series, TI-85, TI-86, and TI-81), TilEm will emulate the behavior of the calculator without requiring the actual calculator hardware.

TilEm is licensed under the GPL License.

Linux emulation software
Graphing calculator software